A quintet is a group containing five members. It is commonly associated with musical groups, such as a string quintet, or a group of five singers, but can be applied to any situation where five similar or related objects are considered a single unit.

Overview
In classical instrumental music, any additional instrument (such as a piano, clarinet, oboe, etc.) joined to the usual string quartet (two violins, a viola, and a cello), gives the resulting ensemble its name, such as "piano quintet", "clarinet quintet", etc. A piece of music written for such a group is similarly named.

The standard wind quintet consists of one player each on flute, oboe, clarinet, bassoon, and horn, while the standard brass quintet has two trumpets, horn, trombone, and tuba. Other combinations are sometimes found, however.

In jazz music, a quintet is group of five players, usually consisting of two of any of the following instruments, guitar, trumpet, saxophone, clarinet, flute or trombone, in addition to those of the traditional jazz trio – piano, double bass, drums. 

In some modern bands there are quintets formed from the same family of instruments with various voices, as an all-brass ensemble, or all saxophones, in soprano, alto, baritone, and bass, and sometimes contrabass.

Notable quintets

Performing groups
 Amsterdam Wind Quintet
 Arabesque Winds
 Artecombo
 Bergen Wind Quintet
 
 Blythwood Winds
 Carion 
 Canadian Brass
 I Cinque Elementi Wind Quintet
 The City of Tomorrow
 Coreopsis Quintet
 Danzi Quintet
 Dorian Wind Quintet
 
 Fifth Inversion
 Galliard Ensemble
 Hi-5 (Australian band)
 Imani Winds (Grammy nominated 2006)
 LutosAir Quintet
 New London Chamber Ensemble
 New York Woodwind Quintet
 Pentaèdre (Montréal)
 Pennsylvania Quintet
 Quintet of the Americas
 Quintette Aquilon
 Soni Ventorum Wind Quintet
 Vancouver Woodwind Quintet
 Vento Chiaro
 WindSync

Classical music 
 Boccherini: String Quintet in E major, Op. 11, No. 5
 Mozart: Quintet for Piano and Winds K. 452 (oboe, clarinet, bassoon and horn) (1784) 
 Mozart: Quintet for clarinet and strings in A major, K. 581 (1789) 
 Reicha: wind quintets, among the first for the medium (starting in 1811)
 Schubert: Piano Quintet in A major, D. 667 (1819), popularly known as the 'Trout Quintet', based on his Lied "Die Forelle" ("the trout"). The piece is scored for violin, viola, cello, bass instead of an additional violin, and piano, unlike the usual arrangement of the piano quintet
 Schubert: String Quintet in C major, Op. 163 (D. 956, 1828)
 Schumann: Piano Quintet in E-flat, Op. 44 (1842)
 Brahms: Piano Quintet in F minor, Op. 34 (1862); String Quintet in F major, Op. 88 (1882); Clarinet Quintet in B minor, Op. 115 (1891)
 Dvorak: Piano Quintet No. 1, Op.5 (1872), and Op. 81 (1887), heavily influenced by both the Schubert and Schumann piano quintets
 Dvorak: String Quintet No. 3 (American)
 Bizet: opera Carmen contains a quintet (not always performed), by singers playing some of the smugglers (1873–74)
 Bruckner: String Quintet in F major (1879)
 Labor: Quintet for Clarinet, Violin, Viola, Cello and Piano (1900)
 Paul Hindemith: Kleine Kammermusik, Op. 24, No. 2 (1922)
 Nielsen: Wind Quintet (1922)
 Schoenberg: Wind Quintet, Op. 26 (1923–24)
 Martinů: String Quintet (1927)
 Villa-Lobos: Quinteto (em forma de chôros) (1928)
 Shostakovich: Piano Quintet in G minor, Op. 57 (1940)
 Stockhausen: Zeitmaße (1955–56)
 Perle: Wind Quintet No. 4 (1984–85)
 MacMillan: Horn Quintet (2007)
 Holloway: Horn Quintet (2020)
 Seabourne: Fall - Horn Quintet (2020)

Jazz
 'The Greatest Concert Ever.' Jazz quintet. Charlie Parker, alto saxophone; Dizzy Gillespie, trumpet; Bud Powell, piano; Charles Mingus, bass; and Max Roach, drums. Massey Hall, Toronto, Canada. (15 May 1953) This concert took place against all odds: Bud Powell was drunk; Charlie Parker, identified as "Charlie Chan" in the original notes, played on a plastic alto saxophone; and Dizzy Gillespie would disappear offstage to check on the status of the first Rocky Marciano-Jersey Joe Walcott heavyweight championship match.
 Miles Davis' First and Second 'great' Quintets:
 The First Great Quintet (1955–1958) Miles Davis, trumpet; John Coltrane, tenor saxophone; Red Garland, piano; Paul Chambers, bass; Philly Joe Jones, drums.
 The Second Great Quintet (1964–1968) Miles Davis, trumpet; Wayne Shorter, tenor saxophone; Herbie Hancock, piano; Ron Carter, bass; Tony Williams, drums.

Soul/R&B
 Hi-Five
 The Temptations 1960–present
 The Dells 1954–present
 The Dramatics 
The Spinners
 The Tavares
 The Stylistics 
 Blue Magic 
 Jackson 5 1964–1975,
 The Jacksons 1976–

Doo wop
 The Moonglows
 The Heartbeats
 The Jive Five
 The Flamingos
 The Five Keys
 The Five Satins

Pop
 Day6 2015–present
 KNK (band) 2016–present
 4Minute 2009–2016
 Red Velvet (South Korea) 2014–present
 Vocal Unit from Seventeen (band) 2015–present
 One Direction 2010–2016

References

 
Chamber music
Types of musical groups

5